The Goguryeo–Wa War occurred at the end of the 4th century and the beginning of the 5th century between Goguryeo and the Baekje–Wa alliance. As a result, Goguryeo made both Silla and Baekje its subjects, bringing about a unification of the Three Kingdoms of Korea that lasted about 50 years.

Timeline 

396: Gwanggaeto the Great led his troops and attacked Baekje, conquering many castles along the way. Gwanggaeto captured the Baekje capital and forced Asin to surrender and become his subject. Gwanggaeto gained 58 towns and 700 villages, and returned home with hostages, including a Baekje prince and several ministers.
399: Baekje broke its previous allegiance to Goguryeo and allied with Wa. In Pyongyang, Gwanggaeto was greeted by the Sillan envoy Silseong who notified him that Baekje and Wa troops were crossing the border to invade Silla, and requested Goguryeo's aid. As Silla was a loyal ally of Goguryeo, Gwanggaeto agreed to help them.
400: Gwanggaeto sent 50,000 soldiers to defend Silla. As Goguryeo troops reached the Silla capital, the Baekje and Wa armies retreated toward Gaya. The Goguryeo and Silla alliance attacked and pursued the Baekje and Wa forces to the castle in Alla, where the Baekje, Wa, and Gaya troops surrendered.
404: Wa unexpectedly invaded the southern border of the former Daifang territory. Gwanggaeto led his troops and defeated the Wa forces in the vicinity of Pyongyang. The Wa army was defeated and many Wa soldiers were killed.

References

4th-century conflicts
400s conflicts
Wars involving Goguryeo
Wars involving Japan
5th century in Japan
4th century in Japan
390s
400s
391
404
Japan–Korea relations